The Players Tour Championship 2012/2013 – Event 1 was a professional minor-ranking snooker tournament that took place between 18 and 22 July 2012 at the South West Snooker Academy in Gloucester, England.

Stephen Maguire won his eighth professional title by defeating Jack Lisowski 4–3 in the final.

Prize fund and ranking points
The breakdown of prize money and ranking points of the event is shown below:

1 Only professional players can earn ranking points.

Main draw

Preliminary rounds

Round 1 
Best of 7 frames

Round 2 
Best of 7 frames

Main rounds

Top half

Section 1

Section 2

Section 3

Section 4

Bottom half

Section 5

Section 6

Section 7

Section 8

Finals

Century breaks 

 141  Ali Carter
 138  Marco Fu
 136  Paul Davison
 135  Tom Maxfield
 133, 110  Luca Brecel
 131  Sam Baird
 129, 105  Cao Yupeng
 128  Jack Lisowski
 125, 122  Stephen Maguire
 125  John Astley
 124, 117  Barry Hawkins
 124  Alex Taubman
 124  Craig Steadman
 123, 105, 100  Joe Perry
 121  Chris Norbury

 119, 117  Xiao Guodong
 118  Jamie Burnett
 114, 109  Judd Trump
 111  Aditya Mehta
 109  Yu Delu
 105  Anthony McGill
 103  James Wattana
 103  Liu Chuang
 102  Lee Page
 102  Jamie Cope
 101, 101  Andrew Norman
 101  Michael Holt
 101  Rod Lawler
 100  Ben Woollaston

References

External links 
UK PTC 2012 Event 1: Qualifs Day 1 pictures by MoniqueLimbos at Facebook
UK PTC 2012 Event 1: Qualifs Day 2 pictures by MoniqueLimbos at Facebook
UK PTC 2012 Event 1: Main Day 1 pictures by MoniqueLimbos at Facebook
UK PTC 2012 Event 1: Main Day 2 pictures by MoniqueLimbos at Facebook
UK PTC 2012 Event 1: Main Day 3 pictures by MoniqueLimbos at Facebook

1
2012 in English sport
July 2012 sports events in the United Kingdom